Carolyn Judith Hewson AO (née Somerville; born July 1955) is an Australian business woman.

She studied at the University of Adelaide and at the University of Cambridge.

She is a Director of BHP, YWCA, and the Breast Cancer Research Foundation.

She has previously held top executive positions with Schroders Australia; BT Investment Management, Westpac, AMP, CSR, AGL Energy, the Australian Gas Light Company, SA Water, and the Economic Development Board (South Australia).

Carolyn Somerville married John Hewson in 1988. The couple have a daughter born around 1995 after John retired from Parliament but their marriage ended in 2004. The Hewsons lived in Sydney, but Carolyn flew to Adelaide once a month for board meetings, and took her pre-school daughter with her.

Hewson was made an Officer of the Order of Australia (AO) in the 2009 Queen's Birthday Honours "for service to the community through support for charitable organisations, particularly YWCA, and to business," has been recognized as "one of Australia’s most influential company directors," and ranked as "Australia’s most influential female board directors" by The Australian Financial Review. In 2017 she was on the panel of judges for the Workplace Giving Excellence Awards. In 2014 she was named as one of four possible candidates to become South Australia's next Governor, but the position was eventually given to Hieu Van Le.

In January 2019, Hewson was announced as one of the members of the board of Infrastructure SA, an organisation tasked by the Government of South Australia under Steven Marshall to develop a 20-year infrastructure strategy and five-year plans.

Hewson has spoken in support of proposed laws that would mandate 40% of roles on Government boards be filled by women and that cultural roles needed to adapt to support the realities of bringing up children.

In December 2020, Hewson was appointed as a member of the board of Reserve Bank of Australia.

References

Living people
1955 births
Australian business executives
Schroders people
Place of birth missing (living people)
University of Adelaide alumni
Alumni of the University of Cambridge
Australian women business executives
Officers of the Order of Australia